Lyropupa is a genus of air-breathing land snails, terrestrial pulmonate gastropod mollusks in the family Pupillidae.

Species
Species within the genus Lyropupa include:
 Lyropupa anceyana
 Lyropupa clathratula
 Lyropupa hawaiiensis
 Lyropupa lyrata
 Lyropupa microthauma
 Lyropupa mirabilis
 Lyropupa perlonga
 Lyropupa prisca
 Lyropupa rhabdota
 Lyropupa scabra
 Lyropupa spaldingi
 Lyropupa sparna
 Lyropupa striatula
 Lyropupa thaanumi
 Lyropupa truncata

References

 
Gastropod genera
Taxonomy articles created by Polbot